Moussa Coulibaly may refer to: 
 Moussa Coulibaly (footballer born 1981), Malian football player for Libyan Premier League club Darnes
 Moussa Coulibaly (footballer born 1993), Iranian football defender of Malian descent
 Moussa Coulibaly (Islamic militant), perpetrator of the 2015 Nice stabbing attack